Louise "Lou" Dobson OAM OLY (born 1 September 1972 Shepparton, Victoria) is a former field hockey player from Australia, who earned a total number of 230 international caps for the Australian Women's National Team, in which she scored 58 goals. She was a member of the squad, that won the gold medal at the 1996 Summer Olympics in Atlanta, United States.

International senior competitions
 1996 – Summer Olympics, Atlanta, United States (1st)
 1997 – Champions Trophy, Berlin, Germany (1st)
 1998 – Commonwealth Games, Kuala Lumpur, Malaysia (1st)
 1999 – Champions Trophy, Brisbane, Australia (1st)
 2000 – Champions Trophy, Amstelveen, Netherlands (3rd)
 2001 – Champions Trophy, Amstelveen, Netherlands (3rd)
 2002 – World Cup, Perth, Australia (4th)
 2003 – Champions Trophy, Sydney, Australia (1st)
 2004 – Summer Olympics, Athens, Greece (5th)

References

External links
 
 Profile at Olympic.org

1972 births
Living people
Australian female field hockey players
Field hockey players at the 1996 Summer Olympics
Field hockey players at the 2004 Summer Olympics
Olympic field hockey players of Australia
Olympic gold medalists for Australia
People from Shepparton
Recipients of the Medal of the Order of Australia
Commonwealth Games gold medallists for Australia
Commonwealth Games bronze medallists for Australia
Olympic medalists in field hockey
Medalists at the 1996 Summer Olympics
Commonwealth Games medallists in field hockey
Field hockey players at the 1998 Commonwealth Games
Field hockey players at the 2002 Commonwealth Games
Medallists at the 1998 Commonwealth Games
Medallists at the 2002 Commonwealth Games